Christian Medical Fellowship of Australia has its historical roots in the Inter Varsity Fellowship (IVF) and the Christian Medical Fellowship (CMF) that started in the UK. At the same time as many other similar groups were being set up around the world after World War II, many separate Australian state fellowships of doctors and dentists were being founded.

These groups united as a national body in 1962 but it was not until 1998 that the Christian Medical and Dental Fellowship of Australia (CMDFA) was officially established. In 2000 the central office in Sydney opened to assist with growing administrative needs.

CMDFA is linked with the International Christian Medical and Dental Association.

Aims of CMDFA
To provide a Fellowship in which members may share and discuss their experience as Christians in the professions of medicine and dentistry.
To encourage Christian doctors and dentists to realise their potential, serving and honouring God in their professional practice.
To present the claims of Christ to colleagues and others and to win their allegiance to Him.
To provide a forum to discuss the application of the Christian faith to the problems of national and local life as they relate to medicine and dentistry.
To foster active interest in mission.
To strengthen and encourage Christian medical and dental students in their faith.
To encourage members to play a full part in the activities of their local churches.
To provide pastoral support when appropriate.

See also
ICMDA

External links
CMDFA
ICMDA

Evangelical parachurch organizations
Medical and health organisations based in Australia
Dental organizations